Stella Voskovetskaya is a dancer, choreographer and dance instructor.

Biography
Voskovetskaya was born on February 6, 1965, in Kiev Ukraine. In 1971, Voskovetskaya was accepted at the Kiev Ballet School (teachers Lyudmila Krymskaya and Galina Kirilova). Four years later she was accepted at Vaganova Academy of Russian Ballet,
graduating in 1983. She was later admitted to the Corps de Ballet of the Kirov Ballet Theater (now Mariinsky Theater) where she was worked from 1983 to 1993.

In 1984 Stella was promoted to coryphée, and later to demi-soloist (or Second Soloist)
In 1994, she was invited to work at Igor Moiseyev Ballet, as a First Character Dancer.

After retiring in 2000, Voskovetskaya returned to Kyiv, where she founded Academic Children's Dance Ensemble. In 2004, she moved to the US, where she helped found Voronov Academy of Ballet in Chicago. In 2010, she began working with several ballet schools in Chicago, preparing students for prestigious international ballet competitions. In 2012, Voskovetskaya opened her own school, and after the reorganization in 2016, continues to work at the school preparing students for professional careers in ballet.

Currently Mrs. Voskovetskaya is a founder and Artistic Director of Illinois Classical Ballet.

Repertoire
Gamzatti and 2nd Shade in La Bayadère.
Henrietta in Raymonda
Gulnare and Odalisque in Le Corsaire.
Pas de trois and Neapolitan Dance in Swan Lake
Nancy in La Sylphide.
Zobeide in Scheherazade
Sugar Plum Fairy in The Nutcracker.
Lilac Fairy and Candide Fairy in The Sleeping Beauty.
Peasant Pas de deux in Giselle 
Zobeide in Scheherazade.
Mercedes and Queen of the Dryads in Don Quixote
Eleventh Waltz and First Waltz in Les Sylphides
Cinderella in Cinderella
Sea Princess in The Little Humpbacked Horse

Member of
The International Dance Council
Dance USA
National Dance Education Organization

External links

Russian ballet dancers - Stella Voskovetskaya
Illinois Classical Ballet

References
Stella Voskovetskaya
HP News
Ballet Universe - Stella Voskovetskaya
Dance Informa Stella Voskovetskaya
Histropedia Stella Voskovetskaya
Summer Intensive
Biography

1965 births
Living people
Ballet choreographers
Russian ballerinas
Russian choreographers
Vaganova graduates
20th-century Russian ballet dancers